Diplolaena drummondii is an endemic Australian flowering plant in the family Rutaceae. It is only found in Western Australia. It is a small, spreading shrub with oblong to elliptic papery, thin leaves, and yellow, orange or reddish flowers which bloom between July and November.

Description
The leaf upper surface is covered sparsely with short, soft hairs, the underside sparsely to moderately covered with star-shaped hairs. Flowering occurs from July to November.

Taxonomy
Diplolaena drummondii was first formally described in 1863 by George Bentham who gave it the name Diplolaena microcephala var. drummondii in Flora Australiensis.In 1921 Carl Hansen Ostenfeld raised the variety to species status as Diplolaena drummondii and the change was published in Contributions to West Australian Botany, part III : Additions and notes to the flora of extra-tropical W. Australia. Biologiske meddelelser, Kongelige Danske Videnskabernes Selskab.

Distribution and habitat
This species grows in woodland near Mundaring and Collie in the Darling Range.

References

Sapindales of Australia
Rosids of Western Australia
Zanthoxyloideae